Mary Hawkins Butler (born December 12, 1953) has served since 1981 as the Republican Party mayor of Madison in suburban Jackson, Mississippi. She is serving her tenth consecutive four-year term. First elected to office at age twenty-eight, she is among the longest-serving mayors in the United States.

Career
She earned a Bachelor of Business Administration degree from Belhaven University in the capital city of Jackson.

Butler was an alderman prior to her election as mayor of Madison in 1981. In 2021, Butler filed a lawsuit to overturn a voter-approved medical marijuana ballot initiative. She claimed there is a flaw in the state initiative process therefore medical marijuana initiative is invalid. Supreme Court of Mississippi agreed with Butler and overturned the medical marijuana initiative.    

Butler ran unsuccessfully for state auditor in the 2015 elections against incumbent Stacey E. Pickering of Laurel in the Republican primary.

Controversies

On April 23, 2015, Hawkins Butler gave her annual "State of the City Address," in which she compared city engineer Rudy Warnock to a corrupt state official, Chris Epps. As a result, Warnock threatened a lawsuit against Hawkins Butler. She has publicly stated that she believes the entire Madison Board of Directors is corrupt, even saying that all of its members need to be replaced.

In 2020, Initiative 65 was approved in Mississippi, allowing doctors to prescribe medical marijuana. This Initiative was approved by a majority of 74%, winning all 82 counties. Mayor Butler filed a lawsuit in the Mississippi Supreme Court asking the court to invalidate the measure. On May 14, 2021, the Mississippi Supreme Court ruled 6-3 that Ballot Measure 1 (Initiative 65) was insufficient because it did not comply with the signature distribution requirements in the Mississippi Constitution and held that any subsequent proceeding regarding the initiatives were void. In February 2022, legislation was signed into law legalizing medical marijuana.

References

1953 births
Living people
Mississippi Republicans
Women in Mississippi politics
Mayors of places in Mississippi
Place of birth missing (living people)
Belhaven University alumni
People from Madison, Mississippi
Women mayors of places in Mississippi